Roll Safe is the name of the character in British filmmaker and actor Kayode Ewumi's web series Hood Documentary of which a screencap became an Internet meme. In the meme Kayode Ewumi is seen tapping his finger on his head while portraying the character Reece Simpson (Roll Safe). The images are often captioned with various jokes mocking poor decision making and failures in critical thinking.

The episode was published in June 2016 and, months later, was used as a reaction image by some British Twitter accounts. In late January 2017, its popularity increased drastically, especially on the Black Twitter community. Khal of Complex declared it was "the New Petty Meme for 2017", Desire Thompson of Vibe said it was "The Best Way To Kick Off Black History Month", and "robopanda" of Yahoo said the meme "Is Here To Give You The Best Worst Advice".

It was included on many best 2017 memes lists, including Thrillist, Complex, BuzzFeed News, The Daily Dot, Insider, BBC News, PCMag, Washington Post, PopBuzz, and MTV UK. The Reddit moderators of the /r/MemeEconomy subreddit told Inverse that they thought it was one of the best memes of 2017.

It was a finalist in the 10th Shorty Awards.

References

External links 

Internet memes introduced in 2017